Layla AbdelRahim is a Russian-Sudanese comparatist anthropologist and anarchoprimitivist author, whose works on narratives of civilization and wilderness have contributed to the fields of literary and cultural studies, comparative literature, philosophy, animal studies, ecophilosophy, sociology, anarcho-primitivist thought, anarchism, epistemology, and critique of civilization, technology, and education. She attributes the collapse in the diversity of bio-systems and environmental degradation to monoculturalism and the civilized ontology that explains existence in terms of anthropocentric utilitarian functions.

Her books Children's Literature, Domestication, and Social Foundation: Narratives of Civilization and Wilderness (Routledge 2015) and Wild Children – Domesticated Dreams: Civilization and the Birth of Education (Fernwood 2013) make a contribution to children's literary theory and a critique of education as rooted in the civilized need for the domestication of children as resources.

Education
AbdelRahim received her A.B. from Bryn Mawr College and, upon graduation in 1993, received the Thomas J. Watson Fellowship to pursue an anthropological project in Europe. She did graduate work in 1993–94 at the School for Advanced Studies in the Social Sciences (École des hautes études en sciences sociales) or l'EHESS and master studies in social sciences at Stockholm University where she later worked as Visiting Researcher at the department of social anthropology. She completed her Ph.D. at the Université de Montréal, Department of Comparative Literature. Her dissertation entitled Order and the Literary Rendering of Chaos: Children's Literature as Knowledge, Culture, and Social Foundation, examines the effect of ontological premises on human self-knowledge (anthropology) and the repercussions of such knowledge on the anthropogenic destruction of the world's life systems and diversity.

Thought
AbdelRahim traces the root of all oppression to the ontological premises of domestication that define the raison d'être of living and non-living beings in terms of consumption and co-existence in a hierarchy of food chain. Drawing on paleontological studies, ethology, and biological anthropology, she challenges the precepts in the narrative of anthropology that constructs the human as predator and consumer. This critique extends to civilized economic and socio-political cultures and their effect on the environment as well as on systems of education and parenting. Her examination of civilized and wild narratives is relevant to a variety of domains and disciplines, such as philosophy of science, evolutionary theory, anthropology, sociology, cultural studies, environmental economics, education, literary theory.

Media appearances
AbdelRahim is featured in anOther Story of Progress, a documentary film by Thomas Toivonen, as one of the world's leading contemporary anarcho-primitivist philosophers.

Selected works

Books

Articles

References

External links
Layla AbdelRahim's website

Living people
21st-century Canadian non-fiction writers
21st-century Canadian women writers
21st-century Russian women writers
Anarchist theorists
Anarchist writers
Anarcho-primitivists
Bryn Mawr College alumni
Canadian women anthropologists
Canadian women non-fiction writers
Deep ecologists
Green anarchists
Russian people of Sudanese descent
Russian women anthropologists
School for Advanced Studies in the Social Sciences alumni
Stockholm University alumni
Université de Montréal alumni
Watson Fellows
Writers from Montreal
Year of birth missing (living people)
Russian anarchists
Sudanese anarchists